Fool Me Once is an upcoming eight-part television series made for Netflix by Quay Street Productions, adapted from the 2016 Harlan Coben novel of the same name by Danny Brocklehurst. Michelle Keegan, Richard Armitage, Adeel Akhtar and Joanna Lumley are set to appear in the series.

Synopsis
A family have been shaken by two murders. Maya Stern (Keegan) watches security camera footage of her house sees her murdered husband Joe (Armstrong) back as an intruder. Meanwhile, Abby and Daniel, her nephew and niece, are trying to find the truth about the murder of their mother and seeing possible connections between both cases.

Cast
Michelle Keegan as Maya Stern
Richard Armitage as Joe
Adeel Akhtar as DS Sami Kierce
Joanna Lumley as Judith Burkett
Emmett J Scanlan as Shane Tessier 
Dino Fetscher as Marty McGreggor
Marcus Garvey
Hattie Morahan
James Northcote
Dänya Griver
Daniel Burt
Adelle Leonce
Natalia Kostrzewa
Laura Gibbons

Production

Development
The television series will be set in the United Kingdom, as opposed to the American setting of the Coben novel. Coben, who created the series, will also serve as an executive producer on the show. It is one of a number of  adaptations of Coben’s work by Netflix. Danny Brocklehurst is head writer and executive producer. Nicola Shindler and Richard Fee are executive producers via Quay Street Productions. Jessica Taylor is also a  producer. Episodes are set to be directed by David Moore and Nimer Rashed.

Filming
Filming started in Manchester, England in February 2023, and will take in other locations in the north-west.

Broadcast
The series is expected to be available worldwide.

References

 
2023 British television series debuts
2020s British crime drama television series
2020s British television miniseries
British thriller television series
English-language Netflix original programming
Television shows based on American novels
Television shows filmed in England
Upcoming drama television series
Upcoming Netflix original programming